John Garth House, also known as Woodside Place, is a historic home located near Hannibal, Ralls County, Missouri.  It was built about 1871, and is a -story, Second Empire style frame dwelling.  It measures approximately 99 feet by 54 feet and sits on a limestone block foundation. It features mansard roofs, projecting tower, four porches, and two semi-octagonal bay windows. It was built as a summer home for John H. Garth a prominent local citizen of Hannibal, Missouri and friend of Samuel Clemens. It is operated as Garth Woodside Mansion Bed and Breakfast Inn.

It was listed on the National Register of Historic Places in 1977.

References

External links
Garth Woodside Mansion Bed and Breakfast Inn

Bed and breakfasts in Missouri
Houses on the National Register of Historic Places in Missouri
Second Empire architecture in Missouri
Houses completed in 1871
Houses in Ralls County, Missouri
National Register of Historic Places in Ralls County, Missouri